Wahroonga is an electoral district of the Legislative Assembly in the Australian state of New South Wales. It is due to be contested for the first time at the 2023 election.

It is an urban electorate on Sydney's upper North Shore, taking in the suburbs of Normanhurst, North Wahroonga, South Turramurra, Thornleigh, Wahroonga, Waitara, Warrawee, West Pymble, Westleigh and parts of Hornsby, Pennant Hills, Pymble and Turramurra.

Wahroonga was created as a result of the 2021 redistribution and largely replaces the abolished electorate of Ku-ring-gai. Based on the results of the 2019 election, it is a safe seat for the Liberal Party with an estimated notional margin of 19.0 percent.

References

External links
New South Wales Redistributions 2021

Electoral districts of New South Wales